Constance Cary Harrison (pen name, Refugitta; April 25, 1843 – November 21, 1920), also referred as Mrs. Burton Harrison, was an American playwright and novelist. She and two of her cousins were known as the "Cary Invincibles"; the three sewed the first examples of the Confederate Battle Flag.

Harrison belonged to an old Virginia family related to the Fairfaxes and Jeffersons. Her home was destroyed during the American Civil War and consequently she witnessed much of the horrors of that struggle. After its close, she accompanied her mother to Europe and while in France. Upon her return to the United States, she married Burton Harrison, a lawyer and American democratic politician, who was at one time the Secretary of President Jefferson Davis. They moved to New York in 1876, and there she began her literary life. Her first magazine article was A Little Centennial Lady, which attracted much attention, and thereafter, she wrote a great deal.

Few literary women in New York were better known at the time, her home a social and literary center. She produced several plays, chiefly adaptations from the French. The work that probably gained her more reputation abroad was The Anglomaniacs, which appeared in The Century without her name. It ranked her at once among the best of the novelists. Some of her other works included, Golden Rod, The Story of Helen Troy, Woman's Handiwork in Modern Houses, Old-Fashioned Fairy Book, Bric-a-Brac Stories, Flower de Hundred, Miy Lord Fairfax of Greenway Court, The Homes and Haunts of Washington, The Russian Honeymoon, Sweet Bells Out of Tune, A Daughter of the South and Other Tales, Bar Harbor Days, and An edelweiss of the Sierras, Golden-rod, and other tales.

Origins
Constance Fairfax Cary was born at Lexington, Kentucky (some sources cite 
Port Gibson, Mississippi) on April 25, 1843 into a planter aristocrat family, to parents Archibald and Monimia ( Fairfax) Cary. Archibald Cary was the son of Wilson Jefferson Cary and Virginia Randolph.

Wilson Jefferson Cary was a descendant of the ancient and prominent English gentry family of Cary, lords of the manor of Clovelly in Devon and of Cockington and Tor Abbey, as is related in a genealogical work by Fairfax Harrison (1869-1938) of Belvoir House, Fauquier County, Virginia (son of Constance Cary Harrison) The Devon Carys, 2 vols., New York, 1920.

Monimia Fairfax was the daughter of Thomas Fairfax, 9th Lord Fairfax of Cameron, and Margaret Herbert, who was the granddaughter of John Carlyle and Sarah Fairfax. Her brother was Clarence Cary, who was prominent in New York society.  Archibald Cary was a subscriber to the Monticello Graveyard (1837). They lived at Cumberland, Maryland, where he was editor of its leading newspaper, The Cumberland Civilian. When he died in 1854, her mother, Monimia, moved the family, in with her grandmother at Vaucluse Plantation in Fairfax County, Virginia, until the outbreak of the Civil War.

Civil War years

After the seizure of Vaucluse and its demolition (to construct Fort Worth, as a part of the defenses of Washington, D.C.) she lived in Richmond, Virginia during the American Civil War and moved in the same set as Varina Davis, Mary Boykin Chesnut, and Virginia Clay-Clopton. She was published in Southern magazines under the pen name "Refugitta."

Constance Cary lived with her Baltimore cousins, Hetty and Jennie; her mother served as the girls' chaperone. The three young ladies became known as the "Cary Invincibles." In September 1861, they sewed the first examples of the Confederate Battle Flag following a design created by William Porcher Miles and modified by General Joseph E. Johnston.

According to her own account, one flag was given to General Joseph E. Johnston, one to Confederate general P. G. T. Beauregard, and hers to Confederate general Earl Van Dorn. Later during the war, she assisted her mother as a nurse at Camp Winder.

She later met her future husband, Burton Harrison (1838–1904), a private secretary for Confederate President Jefferson Davis, and helped win his release from Fort Delaware after the war's end.

After the war
Harrison and her mother spent the winter of 1865 in Paris before returning to New York City in 1866.  She and Burton Harrison were married on November 26, 1867, at St. Anne's Church (Westchester County, New York). Their wedding breakfast was at Morrisania, the country home of her uncle, Gouverneur Morris Jr. Burton Harrison held various public offices while Constance spent her time writing and being involved in the city's social scene. They were the parents of three sons, including Fairfax Harrison (March 13, 1869 - February 2, 1938), a President of the Southern Railway Company, and Francis Burton Harrison (December 13, 1873- November 22, 1957), who served as a Governor-General of the Philippines.

Among her other contributions to American literature, Constance Cary Harrison persuaded her friend Emma Lazarus to donate a poem to the fundraising effort to pay for a pedestal for the Statue of Liberty.

In 1871, the Harrisons first visited Bar Harbor, Mount Desert Island, Maine, staying at the cottage of Captain Royal George Higgins. Sometime in the 1880s, they commissioned Arthur Rotch of the architectural firm Rotch & Tilden to build a seaside cottage called Sea Urchins, with a garden designed by Beatrix Farrand.  The property now is owned by the College of the Atlantic, transformed into Deering Common, student center. Sea Urchins was the center of hospitality during the "Gilded Age" in Bar Harbor and she entertained many noted visitors there, including friend and neighbor James G. Blaine, who lived at Stanwood. The Harrisons' winter home was a mansion on East 29th Street, New York.

Constance Cary Harrison died in Washington, D.C., in 1920, at the age of 77.  She is buried in Ivy Hill Cemetery, Alexandria, Virginia.

Works

The works of Constance Cary Harrison include:

Magazine articles and stories

Dramatic literature
Two Strings to Her Bow (1884)
The Mouse Trap (1886)
Weeping Wives (1886)
 Behind a Curtain (1887)
Tea at Four O'Clock (1887)

Other prose

 Produced at Madison Square theater in 1888.

 Noted actress Minnie Maddern Fiske appeared in the 1901 production of this play.

References

Bibliography

External links

 
 
 
 
 
 Mrs. Burton Harrison in Encyclopedia Virginia
 The Burton Norvell Harrison Family Papers at the Library of Congress
  (credited as writer for the 1914 movie version of The Unwelcome Mrs. Hatch)
 
 Mrs. Archibald Cary (Monimia Fairfax) (1820-75), (painting)
 
 

1843 births
1920 deaths
People from Port Gibson, Mississippi
American socialites
19th-century American writers
Burials at Ivy Hill Cemetery (Alexandria, Virginia)
Cary family of Virginia
People from Fairfax County, Virginia
Writers from Richmond, Virginia
People of Virginia in the American Civil War
Women in the American Civil War
Writers from Mississippi
Writers from New York City
19th-century American women writers
People from Cumberland, Maryland
19th-century pseudonymous writers
Pseudonymous women writers